The European Film Award for Best Young Actor or Actress was an award given out at the 1988 European Film Awards to recognize an actor or an actress who has delivered an outstanding leading performance in a film industry. So far an award was given only twice. In 1990 it was awarded as the European Discovery of the Year.

See also 
 BAFTA Rising Star Award
 César Award for Most Promising Actress, César Award for Most Promising Actor
 Lumières Award for Most Promising Actress, Lumières Award for Most Promising Actor
 Magritte Award for Most Promising Actor, Magritte Award for Most Promising Actress
 Goya Award for Best New Actress, Goya Award for Best New Actor
 David di Donatello for Best New Actress, David di Donatello for Best New Actor

External links
European Film Academy archive

Awards established in 1988
Awards for young actors
Young Actor or Actress